Sorana Cîrstea defeated Elise Mertens in the final, 6–1, 7–6(7–3) to win the women's singles tennis title at the 2021 İstanbul Cup. This was Cîrstea's first title since 2008, thus achieving the longest gap between titles in WTA history at 12 years, 6 months. Cîrstea did not drop a set throughout the tournament. 

Patricia Maria Țig was the defending champion, but she chose not to participate this year.

Seeds

Draw

Finals

Top half

Bottom half

Qualifying

Seeds

Qualifiers

Lucky loser

Draw

First qualifier

Second qualifier

Third qualifier

Fourth qualifier

Fifth qualifier

Sixth qualifier

References

External Links
 Main Draw
 Qualifying Draw

2021 İstanbul Cup – 1
2021 in Turkish tennis
2021 WTA Tour
2021 in Istanbul